Jasper Vermeerbergen (born 8 January 1988) is a Belgian football player. The defender currently plays for K.S.K. Beveren.

He made his debut in the Belgian First Division playing for K.F.C. Germinal Beerschot against R.A.E.C. Mons on 26 April 2008.

References

1988 births
Beerschot A.C. players
Living people
Belgian footballers
Association football defenders